The Timor stubtail (Urosphena subulata) is a species of bird in the family Cettiidae.
It is found on Timor and northern and eastern adjacent islands.

References

Timor stubtail
Birds of Timor
Timor stubtail
Taxonomy articles created by Polbot